The Karry K60 is a compact crossover produced by Chery under the Karry brand.

Overview

The Karry K60 is available in 5, 6, and 7 seater versions. The engine of the K60 is a 1.5 liter four-cylinder petrol engine with 109hp and 140nm, mated to a five-speed manual transmission powering the front wheels. Top speed of the K60 is 100 kilometer per hour.

The Karry K60 was launched on the China car market in the third quarter of 2016 with prices starting from 58,800 yuan to 81,800 yuan. Despite the K60 being labeled as an SUV, the Karry K60 compact crossover is essentially a lifted MPV with plastic claddings built on a commercial minivan chassis sharing the underpinnings of the Cowin V3 MPV as Karry has always been Chery's commercial vehicle division.

Karry K60 EV

The K60 EV is powered by a 80kW permanent electric motor with 240N·m of torque and a top speed of 120km/h. The battery has a density of 182Wh/kg and is capable of a NEDC range of 301km. The DC fast charging takes 1.5 hours to charge the vehicles fully.

Ciwei EV400
The Ciwei EV400 is an electric compact crossover MPV which is essentially a rebadged Karry K60 EV sold by Ciwei. It is powered by a 51 kWh battery that weighs 350 kg, and has dimensions of 4618 mm/1790 mm/1780 mm, a wheelbase of 2765 mm, and a kerb weight of 1611 kg. The EV400 comes with an AI agent called "Little Hedgehog".

References

External links

Official website

K60
K60
Compact sport utility vehicles
Crossover sport utility vehicles
Cars introduced in 2016
Cars of China

Production electric cars